Armagh City Football Club is an intermediate, Northern Irish football club playing in the NIFL Premier Intermediate League.

History
The club was founded in 1964 as Milford Everton in the village of Milford, just outside Armagh city. The original name was in honour of the founders' favourite English team, Everton. Milford was the village were the penalty kick was first introduced in 1890 when local goalkeeper William McCrum suggested a way to combat illegal challenges near to goal. Milford Everton eventually bought and refurbished the McCrum Institute in the early 1980s as they strove to improve facilities for the 'B' Division. The club was renamed Armagh City after relocating to Armagh in 1988. They played at the Mill Field, Armagh from 1988 to 1993, when they moved to their current ground, Holm Park. They achieved senior status in 1999, but reverted to intermediate status in 2003 when the Irish Premier League was established and the number of senior clubs was reduced from 20 to 16.  In 2005, however, City gained promotion to the Premier League, but after three more seasons at senior level, the club failed to gain a place in the 12-club IFA Premiership and reverted once more to intermediate status as a member of the IFA Championship. The club's colours are azure and black stripes. Former player Marty Rice was named first team manager on 10 July 2010, having been assistant to Ivor McGucken at the start of the 2009–10 season.

During the 2011–12 season Armagh City entered into negotiations with various bodies including the IFA, Armagh City and District Council and SportNI to secure funding to replace their grass pitch with the latest, FIFA approved, 3rd generation pitch. The pitch was laid in summer 2013 and opened in September 2013. The first game for the first team was on 14 September 2013 - a 5–1 win against Lurgan Celtic in the Bob Radcliffe Cup.

Luke Grimley was the last player to score on the old Holm Park in a 1-0 win over rivals Loughgall which clinched the Championship reserve league title managed by Mickey O’Neill and captained by Cillian Sheridan, while Shea McGerrigan was the first player to score in the new Holm Park with a 5-1 win over Lurgan Celtic.

In the 2011-12 season Armagh City F.C Youth (U18) created history by winning their first ever national trophy, the Harry Cavan Irish Youth Cup, defeating Cliftonville 1-0 in the final with a goal from Barry Quinn, the side was managed by John Hynds and Martin Grimley, and captained by Matthew Hynds. On the run to the final the Eagles defeated, Ballymoney United 9-0, Woodvale F.C 7-0 and Glenavon F.C 3-1. In a successful year for the youth side they also lifted the League title undefeated and the League Cup completing a impressive domestic treble.

In the 2013-14 season Armagh City F.C won the double by winning the league and Bob Radcliffe Cup, the side, captained by Liam Cullen also reached the Intermediate Cup Final but were defeated by Bangor F.C 2-1.

The club over the years has reached several Mid Ulster Cup finals with a reasonably large following and have came close to promotion to the NIFL Premiership. The club was relegated to the Premier Intermediate League in the 2016-17 season following a disappointing 7-1 loss to Newry City in the championship relegation play off over two legs. Manager Marty Rice then resigned.

In the summer of 2017 former Cliftonville player Joe Kerr took over as manager of the club for the 2017/18 season with Alex Clifford and Mickey O'Neill as his assistants.

Current squad

Non-playing staff
President: Geoff Lester
Chairman: John Hynds
Vice-Chairman: Aidan Murphy
Treasurer: Geoff Lester
Committee Secretary: Stephen Richardson
Football Secretary: John Hynds
Manager: Shea Campbell 
Assistant Manager: Alex Clifford/Micky O' Neill
Coach: Shane McGeown
Therapist: Gerald Stevenson
Reserve Team Manager: Lee Kirrane
Reserve Team Asst: Matthew Hynds
Representative to IFA: Aidan Murphy
Social Club manager: John Hynds
Youth team coaches: Paul Gartland, Joe Walker, Kieran Slim, Marty McKee, Liam Clarke, Kieran Mullan

Honours

Senior honours
Mid-Ulster Cup: 1
2000–01

Intermediate honours
IFA Intermediate League (tier 2): 1
2004–05
NIFL Championship 2 (tier 3): 1
2013–14
Bob Radcliffe Cup : 5
1991–92, 2004–05, 2013–14, 2015-16, 2020-21

Junior honours
Mid-Ulster League: 1
1973–74
Mid-Ulster Shield: 1
1969–70
Harry Cavan Irish Youth Cup: 1
2011–12
Championship Reserve League: 1
2012-13

References

External links 
 
 Irish League Supporters forum

 
Former senior Irish Football League clubs
Association football clubs established in 1964
Association football clubs in Northern Ireland
Association football clubs in County Armagh
1964 establishments in Northern Ireland
NIFL Premier Intermediate League clubs